The Diocese of Crookston is a Latin Church ecclesiastical territory or diocese of the Catholic Church that covers the northwest section of the state of Minnesota in the United States of America. The Diocese of Crookston is a suffragan diocese in the ecclesiastical province of the metropolitan Archdiocese of St. Paul and Minneapolis.

The episcopal see for the diocese is Crookston, Minnesota.  The cathedral parish of the diocese is the Cathedral of the Immaculate Conception. The Diocese of Crookston comprises the 14 counties of Kittson, Roseau, Lake of the Woods, Marshall, Polk, Red Lake, Pennington, Clearwater, Beltrami, Norman, Mahnomen, Hubbard, Clay and Becker.

The diocese was erected on December 31, 1909, by Pope Pius X with territory drawn from the Archdiocese of Saint Paul.


Bishops
The list of bishops of the diocese and their terms of service:
 Timothy J. Corbett (1910–38)
 John Hubert Peschges (1938–44)
 Francis Joseph Schenk (1945–60), appointed Bishop of Duluth
 Lawrence Alexander Glenn (1960–70)
 Kenneth Joseph Povish (1970–75), appointed Bishop of Lansing
 Victor Hermann Balke (1976-2007)
 Michael Joseph Hoeppner (2007–2021)
 Andrew H. Cozzens (2021-)

Schools
Sacred Heart High School, East Grand Forks

See also

 Catholic Church by country
 Catholic Church in the United States
 Ecclesiastical Province of Saint Paul and Minneapolis
 Global organisation of the Catholic Church
 List of Roman Catholic archdioceses (by country and continent)
 List of Roman Catholic dioceses (alphabetical) (including archdioceses)
 List of Roman Catholic dioceses (structured view) (including archdioceses)
 List of the Catholic dioceses of the United States

References

External links 
Roman Catholic Diocese of Crookston Official Site

 
Crookston
Diocese of Crookston
Polk County, Minnesota
Christian organizations established in 1909
Crookston
Crookston